The fourth season of the television series, Law & Order: Special Victims Unit premiered September 27, 2002 and ended May 16, 2003 on NBC. This was the last season of the series to air on Friday nights at 10pm/9c.

Production
Filming for Season 4 began while Season 3 was still airing as evidenced by reports that Sharon Lawrence would appear on SVU in time for May sweeps.

In a 2012 interview for the show Media Mayhem, Neal Baer cited "Juvenile" as a script whose writing was relevant to still debated case law. In the episode, a well meaning boy is manipulated by a sociopathic classmate and charged with felony murder as a result — a topic that was addressed by Miller v. Alabama in the Supreme Court. In the same interview, Baer talked about the detectives having differing opinions on grey areas of the law. He opined that this contributed to NBC's willingness to let him delve into highly charged topics with no censorship and cited "Mercy" as an example.

Cast changes and returning characters
After two seasons of being a recurring guest star, BD Wong (Dr. George Huang) was added to the opening credits of the fourth season. This was also the last full season to star Stephanie March as ADA Alexandra Cabot. Previous seasons had shown Christopher Meloni and Mariska Hargitay in every episode. The first episode to break this trend was "Rotten", which showed Detective Benson working primarily with Detective Tutuola.

Actor Chad Lowe who had previously guest starred in the second season returned to the set of SVU. However, instead of reprising his character, he directed the season finale. The episode "Dominance" introduced the CSU Captain Judith Siper played by actress and life science executive Caren Browning. Browning continued to appear in this role for the eight seasons that followed. As with Neal Baer, she stated that her role on SVU was beneficial to her job in the healthcare industry: "My work on the show has opened many doors and conversations with the press and clients — so there’s a real synergy there."

Cast

Main cast
 Christopher Meloni as Senior Detective Elliot Stabler
 Mariska Hargitay as Junior Detective Olivia Benson
 Richard Belzer as Senior Detective John Munch
 Stephanie March as Assistant District Attorney Alexandra Cabot
 Ice-T as Junior Detective Odafin "Fin" Tutuola
 BD Wong as FBI Special Agent Dr. George Huang 
 Dann Florek as Captain Donald "Don" Cragen

Crossover stars
 Dianne Wiest as Interim District Attorney Nora Lewin (Crossing over with Law & Order)
 Fred Dalton Thompson as District Attorney Arthur Branch (Crossing over with Law & Order)

Recurring cast

 Juliet Adair Pritner as Officer Bailey
 Illeana Douglas as Defense Attorney Gina Bernardo
 David Lipman as Judge Arthur Cohen
 Jill Marie Lawrence as Defense Attorney Cleo Conrad
 Judith Light as Bureau Chief Assistant District Attorney Elizabeth Donnelly
 Erik Palladino as Detective Dave Duethorn
 Viola Davis as Defense Attorney Donna Emmett
 Welly Yang as Crime Scene Unit Forensics Technician Georgie
 Ned Eisenberg as Defense Attorney Roger Kressler
 Peter Hermann as Defense Attorney Trevor Langan
 Sheila Tousey as Judge Danielle Larsen

 Jordan Gelber as Crime Scene Unit Forensics Technician David Layton
 Joel de la Fuente as Technical Assistance Response Unit Technician Ruben Morales
 Joanna Merlin as Judge Lena Petrovsky
 Harvey Atkin as Judge Alan Ridenour
Caren Browning as Crime Scene Unit Captain Judith Siper
Tom O'Rourke as Judge Mark Seligman
 Daniel Sunjata as Crime Scene Unit Forensics Technician Burt Trevor
 Robert John Burke as Internal Affairs Bureau Sergeant Ed Tucker
 Tamara Tunie as Medical Examiner Dr. Melinda Warner
 Pam Grier as Assistant United States Attorney Claudia Williams

Guest stars

In the season premiere "Chameleon", Sharon Lawrence guest starred as Maggie Peterson, a psychotic prostitute who kills men after she sleeps with them. When discussing the role, Lawrence revealed that her "husband trained as a psychiatrist in a big county psych ward and was very helpful in researching that pathology. It was a great challenge to understand that character's mind." The decorated actress Pam Grier appeared in the fifth episode "Disappearing Acts". She appeared again in the fifteenth episode "Pandora" and was nominated for an NAACP Image Award for Outstanding Supporting Actress in a Drama Series for her time on SVU.

The episode "Angels" guest starred Pablo Santos as Ernesto Diaz, a Guatemalan boy who endured years of living as a sex slave. Of the previous SVU episodes focusing on child molestation, most of them were careful not to expose the child actors to the actual content of the sex crimes. However, Santos discussed several details in his episode as well as in an interview with Zap2it. According to Neal Baer, "We would never do it with, say, a 6-year-old, but we felt like, with a kid who's 15, he can articulate that. It's not something that 15-year-olds haven't heard about. We felt that it's all right." "Waste" explored the question of whether reproductive rights are retained by comatose patients. Bruce Davison and Lisa Pelikan played doctors in the episode marking the first joint appearance by the husband and wife. Philip Bosco's, whose character has Parkinson's disease, would later portray the same dementia in The Savages.

Gloria Reuben guest starred in the episode, "Dolls" as the mother of a missing daughter. Reuben later went on to portray Bureau Chief Assistant District Attorney Christine Danielson in the ninth season and Assistant U.S. Attorney Christine Danielson in the twelfth. Concerning Reuben's Season 4 performance, Michael Buckley of TV Guide wrote "The scenes between Reuben and Ice-T are particularly good, and the detective bends the rules to try to help the agonizing mother." With the episode "Appearances", John Cullum guest starred as ADA Cabot's old law professor-turned-defense attorney Barry Moredock who comes in when defendants' civil and amendment rights are believed to be violated. This role became recurring for Cullum in later seasons. Rob Estes guest stars in "Desperate" as the prime suspect in his second wife's murder. Max Jansen Weinstein guest stars as a silent child in "Desperate", where he witnesses his stepmother's murder.

Jason Ritter made a guest appearance this season after his father appeared in season 3. His character in "Dominance" was a disturbed young adult, assisting in murders to gain the respect of his brother played by Ian Somerhalder. Their father is interpreted by Frank Langella. 

In the episode "Fallacy", Kate Moennig played Cheryl Avery — a transgender woman who was born Charlie Avery. Moennig considered the show to be her initiation to New York City and said "You have to do Law and Order if you lived in New York!" In the episode "Perfect", Barbara Barrie was nominated for the Primetime Emmy Award for Outstanding Guest Actress in a Drama Series. She portrayed Mrs. Haggerty, one of the organizers of a cult who believes she is doing the right thing before having a change of heart at the end of the episode. This episode was the prime-time broadcast network debut for Gale Harold. In the final episode "Soulless", the detectives are on the trail of a vicious sociopath played by Logan Marshall-Green. The detectives have a debate about whether his character has a conscience, and in this scene, Mariska Hargitay was uncomfortable evoking the pessimistic point of view. Neal Baer told her "I'm sure you do [believe there is good in everyone] but Olivia Benson does not."

Episodes

References

Bibliography

External links
 Law & Order: Special Victims Unit Season 4 at TVGuide.com
 Law & Order: Special Victims Unit Season 4 - TV IV
 Season 4 episodes at IMDb.com

04
2002 American television seasons
2003 American television seasons